Acacia aculeatissima, commonly known as thin-leaf wattle or snake wattle, is a shrub belonging to the genus Acacia and the subgenus Phyllodineae that is native to parts of eastern Australia.

Description
It blooms between August and November and produces inflorescences with pale yellow flowers. Each inflorescence occurs a one to three spherical flowers on individual stalks found in the leaf axils.

Taxonomy
The species was first formally described by the botanist James Francis Macbride in 1919 in the article Notes on certain Leguminosae s published in the Contributions of the Gray Herbarium of Harvard University. The only synonyms are Acacia tenuifolia and Racosperma aculeatissimum.<ref>{{cite web|url=https://bie.ala.org.au/species/http://id.biodiversity.org.au/node/apni/2919577|title=Acacia aculeatissima J.F.Macbr.|access-date=28 February 2019|work=Atlas of Living Australia|publisher=Global Biodiversity Information Facility}}</ref>

Distribution
It is found in south western New South Wales where it is considered rare and Victoria where it is more common. It is often a part of Eucalypt'' forest communities and grows in sandy loamy clay soils over sedimentary substrate.

See also
List of Acacia species

References

aculeatissima
Flora of New South Wales
Flora of Victoria (Australia)
Plants described in 1919